Landican is a hamlet on the Wirral Peninsula, in the Metropolitan Borough of Wirral, Merseyside, England. The hamlet is on the outskirts of Birkenhead, near to Woodchurch and the M53 motorway. Historically part of the county of Cheshire, it is within the local government ward of Pensby and Thingwall and the parliamentary constituency of Wirral West.

Landican consists of a small group of cottages and farm buildings as well as a cemetery and crematorium. At the 2001 census the community had a population of only 20.

History
The name possibly derives from Llan diacon, meaning "church of the deacon", with the llan- prefix being of Welsh origin. However, it does not have a parish church and probably refers to Woodchurch. 
Alternatively, the name could refer to the "church of St. Tecan/Tegan", an obscure Welsh saint. 
Landican has been variously spelt over time, including: Landechene (1086), Landekan (1240), Lankekan (1347) and Lancan (1539).

The settlement of Landechene was recorded in the Domesday Book under the ownership of William Malbank and consisting of 21 households (nine villagers, seven smallholders, one priest and four Frenchmen).

The hamlet was a township in Woodchurch Parish of the Wirral Hundred, which became a civil parish in 1866. From 1894 Landican was administered as part of Wirral Rural District before being absorbed into the County Borough of Birkenhead in 1928. The civil parish was abolished on 1 April 1933. 
The population was recorded at 45 in 1801, 57 in 1851, 71 in 1901 and 66 in 1931.

On the 19th of October 1944, a United States Air Force B-24 Liberator bomber from the 703rd Bomb Squadron, 445th Bomb Group based at RAF Tibenham, was on a familiarisation flight when it exploded in mid-air. The bomber crashed near the hamlet with the loss of all 24 people on board. In 1996 a large stone memorial to those who died was erected at the nearby North Cheshire Trading Estate in Prenton.

Geography

Landican Cemetery

Landican Cemetery is situated opposite Arrowe Park and is one of the main cemetery and crematorium sites for the Metropolitan Borough of Wirral. A large population of European hares are known to inhabit the cemetery grounds.

There are 125 Commonwealth service war graves of World War II in the cemetery, 35 of them in a war graves plot, and include two unidentified sailors of the Royal Navy and an unidentified airman.  In addition, a Screen Wall memorial opposite the Cross of Sacrifice at the plot lists 38 service personnel of the same war who were cremated at the crematorium.

Other individuals buried or cremated there include:

Lieutenant-Commander Ian Edward Fraser (1920-2008), VC winner, World War II, diver.
Brigadier Sir Philip Toosey (1904-1975), who while prisoner-of-war of the Japanese in that war was the officer in charge of building the Bridge on the River Kwai.

Notes

References

Bibliography

External links

Hamlets in Merseyside
Towns and villages in the Metropolitan Borough of Wirral